Bengt Arne Odhner (10 August 1918 – 20 November 1990) was a Swedish diplomat.

Career
Odhner was born on 10 August 1918 in Stockholm, Sweden, the son of Professor Nils Hjalmar Odhner and his wife Signhild (née Hagström). He earned a Juris Doctor degree in Genoa in 1944 and served in Genoa and Milan from 1938 to 1945 before becoming an attaché at the Ministry for Foreign Affairs in Stockholm in 1945. Odhner served as an attaché in Tehran and Baghdad from 1947 to 1950 and was the second secretary at the Ministry for Foreign Affairs from 1950 to 1955. He was then first secretary at the Ministry for Foreign Affairs and held the same position in Washington, D.C. from 1955 to 1959. He was legation counsellor in Warsaw from 1959 to 1961 and director at the Ministry for Foreign Affairs (head of international aid cases) from 1962 to 1964. He was ambassador in Baghdad from 1964 to 1969, also accredited to Kuwait City from 1965 to 1969 and ambassador in (Rawalpindi), Islamabad from 1969 to 1973 and ambassador in Tehran, also accredited to Kabul from 1973 to 1978. After that he was trade policy negotiator at the Ministry for Foreign Affairs from 1978 to 1982 and ambassador in Tunis from 1983 to 1984.

Other work
Odhner was the secretary of the Minister for Foreign Affairs from 1950 to 1952, leader of Sweden General Export Association's commerce and industry delegation to East Africa in 1963, secretary, delegate or chairman of trade negotiations with various nations in 1953 and led special missions to such countries as China, North Yemen, Algeria and Indonesia.

Death
Odhner died on 20 November 1990 and was buried at Danderyd cemetery.

Awards and decorations
 Commander of the Order of Homayoun
 Knight of the Order of Orange-Nassau
 Knight of the Order of Merit of the Republic of Hungary

References

1918 births
1990 deaths
Ambassadors of Sweden to Iraq
Ambassadors of Sweden to Pakistan
Ambassadors of Sweden to Iran
Ambassadors of Sweden to Afghanistan
Ambassadors of Sweden to Tunisia
People from Stockholm
Knights of the Order of Orange-Nassau
Knight's Crosses of the Order of Merit of the Republic of Hungary (civil)